Marvin Booker (born March 16, 1990) is an American football defensive end who is currently a free agent. Booker played college football at Rutgers.

Early years
Booker grew up in Piscataway, New Jersey and played under coach Dan Higgins Jr. at Piscataway Township High School, where he graduated in 2008 and would play alongside Dwayne Gratz, J.D. Griggs, Anthony Davis as well as many other future NFL talents. A three-year letter-man, Booker would go on to lead the Chiefs to an 11–1 record, ultimately losing in the North Jersey Section 2 Group IV Final against rival Hunterdon Central. Making the transition from DE to LB in his last year at Piscataway High School, Booker tallied 128 tackles, 20 tackles for loss and 6 sacks.  During his senior season, Booker signed an LOI (Letter of Intent) to attend nearby Rutgers University to join former PHS teammate Anthony Davis under coach Greg Schiano.

College career
Booker played college football at Rutgers. As a true freshman Booker contributed on special teams for 11 out of 13 games. Booker suffered multiple injuries in his college career but found ways to be a solid contributor throughout his college career. During Booker's pro day he weighed in at 6'2/244 and recorded a 4.69 40 yrd-dash, 10' 5" Broad Jump, 34" Vertical, 36 reps of 225lbs, and a 4.19 Short Shuttle.

Professional career

Tampa Bay Buccaneers
On August 5, 2013, Booker was signed by the Tampa Bay Buccaneers. On August 8, 2013, Booker was waived/injured by the Buccaneers. On August 9, 2013, he cleared waivers and was placed on the Buccaneers' injured reserve list.

Winnipeg Blue Bombers
Booker signed with the Winnipeg Blue Bombers on September 4, 2014.

Bloomington Edge
On April 30, 2017, Booker signed with the Bloomington Edge of Champions Indoor Football.

References

External links
Tampa Bay Buccaneers bio
Winnipeg Blue Bombers bio
Rutgers Scarlet Knights bio

1990 births
Living people
American football linebackers
Rutgers Scarlet Knights football players
Tampa Bay Buccaneers players
People from Piscataway, New Jersey
Piscataway High School alumni
Players of American football from New Jersey
Sportspeople from Middlesex County, New Jersey
Brooklyn Bolts players
Bloomington Edge players